Tristia Adele Harrison (nee Clark, born February 1973) is a British businesswoman, the CEO of TalkTalk Group since May 2017.

Early life
She was born Tristia Clark, and grew up in Radlett. She was educated at Watford Grammar School for Girls and St Albans High School for Girls. She studied history at the University of Kent, Canterbury.

Career
Harrison joined TalkTalk in 2010. She was marketing director of Carphone Warehouse, and managing director of TalkTalk Consumer from 2014, before becoming CEO of TalkTalk Group in 2017. She has been a director since 2014. Harrison was a trustee of Comic Relief for almost a decade and the national charity Ambitious about Autism. In 2020 Tristia was named chair of trustees for the national homeless charity, Crisis .

Personal life
She is married to Andrew Harrison, former CEO of Carphone Warehouse. They have two sons and live in west London.

Awards
She received an honorary degree from the University of Salford in 2022.

References

1973 births
Living people
British businesspeople
TalkTalk Group people
People educated at Watford Grammar School for Girls
People educated at St Albans High School for Girls
Alumni of the University of Kent